Closer is the third studio album by Danish singer Christopher. It was released on 15 April 2016, by EMI Records. The album was preceded by the singles "Tulips", "Limousine" featuring Madcon and "I Won't Let You Down" featuring Bekuh Boom, which was released on 1 April.

Title and music
According to Christopher, the album is titled Closer because he has made a record that represents the place he wants to go with his music. He also considers it his most honest and personal album to date.
Christopher also emphasized that with the album there is a close connection between himself and listeners, as well as an opportunity for listeners to understand the personal development he has undergone through the last three years.

Production
Many of the songs began as ideas Christopher played on acoustic guitar in his living room. Others are the result of work in Denmark, Sweden and the United States. Christopher intended to musically challenge himself by collaborating with various producers and songwriters. "Limousine" was written with songwriter Clarence Coffee Jr., who has previously worked with Rihanna and Maroon 5.

Christopher also collaborated with some of his core musical friends; Brandon Beal is again involved. The pair previously collaborated on single "Twerk It Like Miley", which has reached 100 million views on YouTube. Closer features Beal on "Don't Let the Door Hit Ya".

Track listing

Charts

Weekly charts

Year-end charts

References

2016 albums
Christopher (singer) albums